Carl-Erik Holmberg (17 July 1906 – 5 June 1991) was a Swedish football forward who played for Örgryte IS. He also played for the Swedish national team, and was a reserve during the 1934 FIFA World Cup in Italy. He also played for Örgryte IS.

References

1906 births
1991 deaths
Swedish footballers
Sweden international footballers
Association football forwards
Örgryte IS players
Allsvenskan players
1934 FIFA World Cup players